The 1979 Syracuse Orangemen football team represented Syracuse University during the 1979 NCAA Division I-A football season. The team was led by sixth-year head coach Frank Maloney. Due to the ongoing construction of Syracuse's new stadium, the Carrier Dome, home games in 1979 were played in various locations in New York and New Jersey. The Orangemen were invited to the 1979 Independence Bowl, where they defeated McNeese State, 31–7.

Schedule

Roster

References

Syracuse
Syracuse Orange football seasons
Independence Bowl champion seasons
Syracuse Orangemen football